Antonie Hegerlíková (27 November 1923 – 11 December 2012) was a Czech actress, whose career in film, television and theater endured for more than seventy years. Radio Prague called Hegerlíková, "one of the last living stars from the golden era of Czech film."

In addition to film, her television roles included the long running Czechoslovakian 1970s television series, F. L. Věk, based on the novel of the same name. Her theater credits included Maryša, Lady Macbeth in Shakespeare's Macbeth, and Nora in Henrik Ibsen's A Doll's House. Hegerlíková was awarded a Thalia Award in 2004 for her contributions to Czech theater.

Hegerlíková was born in Bratislava, Czechoslovakia, on 27 November 1923. She died in Prague, Czech Republic, on 11 December 2012, at the age of 89.

References

External links

1923 births
2012 deaths
Czech film actresses
Czech stage actresses
Czech television actresses
Merited Artists of Czechoslovakia
Actors from Bratislava
Recipients of the Thalia Award